Lisa Cockburn (born 6 December 1992) is a Scottish rugby player from Basingstoke, who played in the 2021 Women's Six Nations Championship and has competed internationally for Scotland since 2018.

Club career 
Cockburn plays for Darlington Mowden Park Sharks. She debuted for the team in 2013. In 2019, she was one of the players participating in a study for Sunderland University, which found women's rugby matches to be more dynamic and homogenised than men's.

Before joining DMP Sharks, she played for multiple clubs in England including her Universities, Ellingham & Ringwood and Basingstoke. She was one of four players in the 2021 Women's Six Nations Championship to have played for the small local New Forest club of Ellingham & Ringwood.

Whilst at Leeds Metropolitan (now Leeds Beckett), Cockburn supported the team to four BUCS Championship finals.

International career 
Cockburn plays for Scotland through the Scottish Qualified system and was given her first opportunity to play for the side by coach Shade Munro, making her international debut in the Scotland-Italy match of the 2018 Women's Six Nations Championship.

She scored her first try for Scotland in a match against Japan in 2019.

After securing 16 caps, Cockburn was among the Scottish team selected for the 2021 Women's Six Nations Championship, coming on as a replacement at 69 minutes for the play-off against Wales, in which Scotland won 27–20 to secure them fifth place in the tournament. She also came on as a replacement for the Italy match and the opener against England, in which the Scottish side was defeated.

In 2018, she also played in the Glasgow match against Canada, in which the visiting side secured a close-run victory over the Scottish side.

Personal life 
Cockburn graduated with a degree from Leeds Metropolitan University in Sport and Exercise Therapy in 2014. She then went onto study for a MSc in Strength and Conditioning. She cites fellow Scottish player Jade Konkel as her rugby role model.

References

External links 

 Profile Page at Scottish Rugby

1992 births
Living people
Scottish female rugby union players